Vânia or Vania is a given name. Notable people with the name include:

Vânia Abreu (born 1967), singer and performer from Brazil
Vânia Bastos (born 1956), Brazilian singer
Vânia Fernandes (born 1985), Portuguese singer
Vânia Ishii (born 1973), judoka from Brazil
Vania King (born 1989), tennis player from the United States
Anna Vania Mello (born 1979), volleyball player from Italy
Vania Rossi (born 1983), professional cyclocross bicycle racer from Italy
Vânia Silva (born 1980), hammer thrower from Portugal
Vania Stambolova (born 1983), Bulgarian athlete
Vania Vargas (born 1978), Guatemalan poet, narrator, editor, and journalist
 Vânia (footballer), Brazilian women's footballer, who also represented Equatorial Guinea

de:Vania